Gynaecology or gynecology (see spelling differences) is the area of medicine that involves the treatment of women's diseases, especially those of the reproductive organs. It is often paired with the field of obstetrics, forming the combined area of obstetrics and gynecology (OB-GYN).

The term comes from Greek and means "the science of women". Its counterpart is andrology, which deals with medical issues specific to the male reproductive system.

Etymology
The word "gynaecology" comes from the oblique stem (γυναικ-) of the Greek word γυνή (gyne) semantically attached to "woman", and -logia, with the semantic attachment "study". The word gynaecology in Kurdish means "jinekolojî", separated word as "jin-ekolojî", so the Kurdish "jin" called like "gyn" and means in Kurdish "woman".

History

Antiquity

The Kahun Gynaecological Papyrus, dated to about 1800 BC, deals with gynaecological diseases, fertility, pregnancy, contraception, etc. The text is divided into thirty-four sections, each section dealing with a specific problem and containing diagnosis and treatment; no prognosis is suggested. Treatments are non-surgical, comprising applying medicines to the affected body part or swallowing them. The womb is at times seen as the source of complaints manifesting themselves in other body parts.

Ayurveda, an Indian traditional medical system, also provides details about concepts and techniques related to gynaecology.

The Hippocratic Corpus contains several gynaecological treatises dating to the 5th and 4th centuries BC.  Aristotle is another strong source for medical texts from the 4th century BC with his descriptions of biology primarily found in History of Animals, Parts of Animals, Generation of Animals. The gynaecological treatise Gynaikeia by Soranus of Ephesus (1st/2nd century AD) is extant (together with a 6th-century Latin paraphrase by Muscio, a physician of the same school). He was the chief representative of the school of physicians known as the "methodists".

Modern gynaecology. J. Marion Sims

In the medical schools of the early nineteenth century, doctors did not study female reproductive anatomy, seen as repulsive, nor train in pregnancy and childbirth management. That women, because of their anatomy and the risks of the dangerous birthing process, had unique medical concerns and challenges, enough that a doctor might specialize in them, is an innovation widely credited to J. Marion Sims and to a lesser extent his trainee and partner Nathan Bozeman, physicians from Montgomery, Alabama. Sims is widely considered to be the father of modern gynaecology. While there have been isolated precedents for some of his innovations, he was the first to have published on the Sims' position, the Sims' speculum, the Sims sigmoid catheter, and on gynecological surgery, first on repair of vesico-vaginal fistulas, a socially devastating consequence of protracted childbirth, at the time without treatment of any sort. He founded the first women's hospital in the country, first in his backyard in Montgomery, limited to Black enslaved women, then the Woman's Hospital of New York. 

He was elected president of the American Medical Association, and was the first American physician of whom a statue was erected..

Sims developed his new specialty using the bodies of enslaved women, who could not refuse the extended glance of any white male that cared to observe any part of their anatomy. They could not "consent" in the sense modern medical research requires. No one did. Sims did not use anesthesia, for which he would be severely criticized 160 years later.

At the time anesthesia was itself a research area, and the first experiments (in dentistry) were being published. Using early anesthesia (in 1845, say) was much more dangerous and difficult than it would be a century later. In addition, it was widely believed that Blacks did not feel pain as much as whites, and white women proved unable to endure the pain.

At the time, Sims was seen as a hero. Even his enemies, Bozeman chief among them, did not attack him for either experimenting on the enslaved, or for not using anesthesia. Abolitionists such as William Lloyd Garrison were quick to put in print any mistreatment of the enslaved; Garrison's influential The Liberator has been completely indexed, but it never mentions Sims. Nor does the digitized portion of the Black press mention him. When he left Alabama in 1853, a local newspaper called him "an honor to our state".

In the late 20th century, Sims has come to be villainized. Now criticized for his practices, Sims developed some of his techniques by operating on slaves, many of whom were not given anaesthesia. Sims performed surgeries on 12 enslaved women in his homemade backyard hospital for four years. While performing these surgeries he invited men physicians and students to watch invasive and painful procedures while the women were exposed. On one of the women, named Anarcha, he performed 30 surgeries without anesthesia. Due to having so many enslaved women, he would rotate from one to another, continuously trying to perfect the repair of their fistulas. Physicians and students lost interest in assisting Sims over the course of his backyard practice, and he recruited other enslaved women, who were healing from their own surgeries, to assist him. In 1855, Sims went on to found the Woman's Hospital in New York, the first hospital specifically for female disorders.

Examination

In some countries, women must first see a general practitioner (GP; also known as a family practitioner (FP)) prior to seeing a gynaecologist. If their condition requires training, knowledge, surgical procedure, or equipment unavailable to the GP, the patient is then referred to a gynaecologist. In the United States, however, law and many health insurance plans allow gynaecologists to provide primary care in addition to aspects of their own specialty. With this option available, some women opt to see a gynaecological surgeon for non-gynaecological problems without another physician's referral.

As in all of medicine, the main tools of diagnosis are clinical history, examination and investigations. Gynaecological examination is quite intimate, more so than a routine physical exam. It also requires unique instrumentation such as the speculum. The speculum consists of two hinged blades of concave metal or plastic which are used to retract the tissues of the vagina and permit examination of the cervix, the lower part of the uterus located within the upper portion of the vagina. Gynaecologists typically do a bimanual examination (one hand on the abdomen and one or two fingers in the vagina) to palpate the cervix, uterus, ovaries and bony pelvis. It is not uncommon to do a rectovaginal examination for a complete evaluation of the pelvis, particularly if any suspicious masses are appreciated. Male gynaecologists may have a female chaperone for their examination. An abdominal or vaginal ultrasound can be used to confirm any abnormalities appreciated with the bimanual examination or when indicated by the patient's history.

Diseases
Examples of conditions dealt with by a gynaecologist are:
 Cancer and pre-cancerous diseases of the reproductive organs including ovaries, fallopian tubes, uterus, cervix, vagina, and vulva
 Incontinence of urine
 Amenorrhoea (absent menstrual periods)
 Dysmenorrhoea (painful menstrual periods)
 Infertility
 Menorrhagia (heavy menstrual periods); a common indication for hysterectomy
 Prolapse of pelvic organs
 Infections of the vagina (vaginitis), cervix and uterus (including fungal, bacterial, viral, and protozoal)
 Pelvic inflammatory disease
 Urinary tract infections
 Polycystic ovary syndrome
 Premenstrual dysphoric disorder 
 Post-menopausal osteoporosis
Other vaginal diseases
There is some crossover in these areas. For example, a woman with urinary incontinence may be referred to a urologist.

Therapies
As with all surgical specialties, gynaecologists may employ medical or surgical therapies (or many times, both), depending on the exact nature of the problem that they are treating. Pre- and post-operative medical management will often employ many standard drug therapies, such as antibiotics, diuretics, antihypertensives, and antiemetics. Additionally, gynaecologists make frequent use of specialized hormone-modulating therapies (such as Clomifene citrate and hormonal contraception) to treat disorders of the female genital tract that are responsive to pituitary or gonadal signals.

Surgery, however, is the mainstay of gynaecological therapy. For historical and political reasons, gynaecologists were previously not considered "surgeons", although this point has always been the source of some controversy. Modern advancements in both general surgery and gynaecology, however, have blurred many of the once rigid lines of distinction. The rise of sub-specialties within gynaecology which are primarily surgical in nature (for example urogynaecology and gynaecological oncology) have strengthened the reputations of gynaecologists as surgical practitioners, and many surgeons and surgical societies have come to view gynaecologists as comrades of sorts. As proof of this changing attitude, gynaecologists are now eligible for fellowship in both the American College of Surgeons and Royal Colleges of Surgeons, and many newer surgical textbooks include chapters on (at least basic) gynaecological surgery.

Some of the more common operations that gynaecologists perform include:
 Dilation and curettage (removal of the uterine contents for various reasons, including completing a partial miscarriage and diagnostic sampling for dysfunctional uterine bleeding refractive to medical therapy)
 Hysterectomy (removal of the uterus)
 Oophorectomy (removal of the ovaries)
 Tubal ligation (a type of permanent sterilization)
 Hysteroscopy (inspection of the uterine cavity)
 Diagnostic laparoscopy – used to diagnose and treat sources of pelvic and abdominal pain. Laparoscopy is the only way to accurately diagnose pelvic/abdominal endometriosis.
 Exploratory laparotomy – may be used to investigate the level of progression of benign or malignant disease, or to assess and repair damage to the pelvic organs.
 Various surgical treatments for urinary incontinence, including cystoscopy and sub-urethral slings.
 Surgical treatment of pelvic organ prolapse, including correction of cystocele and rectocele.
 Appendectomy – often performed to remove site of painful endometriosis implantation or prophylactically (against future acute appendicitis) at the time of hysterectomy or Caesarean section. May also be performed as part of a staging operation for ovarian cancer.
 Cervical Excision Procedures (including cryosurgery) – removal of the surface of the cervix containing pre-cancerous cells which have been previously identified on Pap smear.

Specialist training

In the UK the Royal College of Obstetricians and Gynaecologists, based in London, encourages the study and advancement of both the science and practice of obstetrics and gynaecology. This is done through postgraduate medical education and training development, and the publication of clinical guidelines and reports on aspects of the specialty and service provision. The RCOG International Office works with other international organisations to help lower maternal morbidity and mortality in under-resourced countries.

Gynaecologic oncology is a subspecialty of gynaecology, dealing with gynaecology-related cancer.

Urogynaecology is a subspecialty of gynaecology and urology dealing with urinary or fecal incontinence and pelvic organ prolapse.

Gender of physicians
Improved access to education and the professions in recent decades has seen women gynaecologists outnumber men in the once male-dominated medical field of gynaecology. In some gynaecological sub-specialties, where an over-representation of males persists, income discrepancies appear to show male practitioners earning higher averages.

Speculations on the decreased numbers of male gynaecologist practitioners report a perceived lack of respect from within the medical profession, limited future employment opportunities and questions to the motivations and character of men who choose the medical field concerned with female sexual organs.

Surveys of women's views on the issue of male doctors conducting intimate examinations show a large and consistent majority found it uncomfortable, were more likely to be embarrassed and less likely to talk openly or in detail about personal information, or discuss their sexual history with a man. The findings raised questions about the ability of male gynaecologists to offer quality care to patients. This, when coupled with more women choosing female physicians has decreased the employment opportunities for men choosing to become gynaecologists.

In the United States, it has been reported that four in five students choosing a residency in gynaecology are now female. In several places in Sweden, to comply with discrimination laws, patients may not choose a doctor—regardless of specialty—based on factors such as ethnicity or gender and declining to see a doctor solely because of preference regarding e.g. the practitioner's skin color or gender may legally be viewed as refusing care. In Turkey, due to patient preference to be seen by another female, there are now few male gynaecologists working in the field.

There have been a number of legal challenges in the US against healthcare providers who have started hiring based on the gender of physicians. Dr. Mircea Veleanu argued, in part, that his former employers discriminated against him by accommodating the wishes of female patients who had requested female doctors for intimate exams. A male nurse complained about an advert for an all-female obstetrics and gynaecology practice in Columbia, Maryland, claiming this was a form of sexual discrimination. Dr. David Garfinkel, a New Jersey-based OB-GYN, sued his former employer after being fired due to, as he claimed, "because I was male, I wasn't drawing as many patients as they'd expected".

See also
Obstetrics and gynaecology
Howard Atwood Kelly
Childbirth and obstetrics in antiquity
Genital schistosomiasis
Hydatidiform mole
Gynography
List of bacterial vaginosis microbiota
Pediatric gynaecology

References

Sources
The Female Reproductive System Britannica

External links

Ingenious: archive of historical images related to obstetrics, gynaecology, and contraception.
U.S. Federal Government Website for Women's Health Information.